"The captain goes down with the ship" is a maritime tradition that a sea captain holds ultimate responsibility for both their ship and everyone embarked on it, and in an emergency will either save those on board or die trying. Although often connected to the sinking of RMS Titanic in 1912 and its captain, Edward J. Smith, the tradition precedes Titanic by at least 11 years. In most instances, captains forgo their own rapid departure of a ship in distress, and concentrate instead on saving other people. It often results in either the death or belated rescue of the captain as the last person on board.

History
The tradition is related to another protocol from the nineteenth century: "women and children first". Both reflect the Victorian ideal of chivalry, in which the upper classes were expected to adhere to a morality tied to sacred honor, service, and respect for the disadvantaged. Rudyard Kipling's poem "Soldier an' Sailor Too" and Samuel Smiles's book, Self-Help, both highlighted the valour of the men who stood at attention and played in the band as their ship was sinking.

Social and legal responsibility
The tradition says that a captain will be the last person to leave a ship alive before its sinking or utter destruction and, if unable to evacuate the crew and passengers, the captain will not save himself even if he can. In a social context, especially as a mariner, the captain will feel compelled to take this responsibility as a social norm. 

In maritime law, the ship's master's responsibility for their vessel is paramount, no matter what its condition, so abandoning a ship has legal consequences, including the nature of salvage rights.

Abandoning a ship in distress may be considered a crime that can lead to imprisonment. Captain Francesco Schettino, who left his ship in the midst of the Costa Concordia disaster of 2012, was not only widely reviled for his actions, but received a 16-year sentence including one year for abandoning his passengers. Abandoning ship has been recorded as a maritime crime for centuries in Spain, Greece, and Italy. South Korean law may also require captains to rescue themselves last. In Finland the Maritime Law (Merilaki) states that the captain must do everything in their power to save everyone on board the ship in distress and that unless the captain's life is in immediate danger, they shall not leave the vessel as long as there is reasonable hope that it can be saved. In the United States, abandoning the ship is not explicitly illegal, but the captain could be charged with other crimes, such as manslaughter, which encompass common law precedent passed down through centuries. It is not illegal under international maritime law.

Notable examples

Captain Luce was able to escape the wreck and swim to the surface after initially going down with the ship. He was rescued two days later drifting on wreckage of the same paddle-wheel box that killed his youngest son Willie.
 September 12, 1857: William Lewis Herndon was in command of the commercial mail steamer  when it encountered a hurricane. Two ships came to the rescue, but could save only a fraction of the passengers, so Captain Herndon chose to remain with the rest.
 September 17, 1894: Captain Deng Shichang, in command of the Zhiyuan during the Battle of the Yalu River, went down with the ship and refused to be rescued, after the ship was struck by a Japanese shell, causing a massive explosion.
 March 27, 1904: Commander Takeo Hirose, in command of the blockship Fukui Maru at the Battle of Port Arthur, went down with the ship while searching for survivors, after the ship sustained a direct strike from Russian coastal artillery, causing it to explode.
 April 13, 1904: Vice Admiral Stepan Makarov of the Imperial Russian Navy went down with his ship, after his ship hit a Japanese naval mine during the early phase of the Siege of Port Arthur.
 April 15, 1912: Captain Edward Smith, in command of  when it sank in the North Atlantic Ocean after striking an iceberg, was seen returning to the bridge just before the ship began its final plunge. There are conflicting accounts of Smith's death. Initial rumours suggest that Smith shot himself, while others suggest that he died on the bridge when it was engulfed by the sea. Reliable accounts suggest that Smith and Thomas Andrews jumped overboard from the bridge as the ship sank, and subsequently perished in the water, possibly near lifeboat Collapsible B. An unknown swimmer who was thought to have been Smith, cried out, "All right boys. Good luck and God bless you", and cheered the occupants on saying "Good boys! Good lads!" before dying.
He refused to leave the ship and with other crew managed to help most passengers to safety on the Princess Victoria. He went down with the ship.
 December 30, 1917: HMT Aragon was torpedoed outside Alexandria, Egypt, after being ordered by Senior Naval Officer on depot ship HMS Hannibal to turn around when having just entered the entrance channel. Confusion over mine clearance and communication procedures resulted in loss of around six hundred and ten  men from troop transport HMT Aragon together with HMS Attack, her escort ship which had just rescued approximately seven hundred men from HMS Aragon. Captain Francis Bateman had overseen the full evacuation and is reported as shouting his last words demanding an inquiry as to why he was ordered out to sea after reaching safe channel. He then jumped overboard going down with his ship. Both ships were torpedoed by the same German U-boat, within less than thirty minutes. 
 May 27, 1918: HMT Leasowe Castle was torpedoed and sunk carrying ~2900 troops and ship's company 104 miles out of Alexandria. Captain Edward John Holl went down with his ship with the exhortation to his crew "...they must be saved!"
 May 30, 1918: When the Italian steamer Pietro Maroncelli was torpedoed by the German submarine  and started to sink, Italian Rear Admiral Giovanni Viglione, who was on board as the convoy commodore, ordered all the survivors into the lifeboats, then chose to stay aboard and to go down with the ship.
 October 25, 1927.
 June 27, 1940. When  was forced to surface by British destroyers in the Mediterranean, her commanding officer, Lieutenant Commander Lorenzo Bezzi, ordered his crew to abandon ship and then scuttled the submarine, going down with it.
 October 21, 1940. Her commanding officer, Lieutenant Commander Costantino Borsini, chose to go down with his ship; seaman Vincenzo Ciaravolo, his attendant, chose to follow him.
 November 5, 1940: German pocket battleship  encountered Allied Convoy HX 84 in the North Atlantic. Her captain, Edward Fegen VC, signalled the convoy to scatter, and attacked the enemy. Jervis Bay was hopelessly outranged and outgunned, and was sunk; her captain and many of her crew went down with her. The sacrifice bought enough time for 31 of the convoy to make it to safety.
 May 24, 1941: During the Battle of the Denmark Strait,  suffered a direct hit and magazine explosion, which sank the ship in three minutes. Only three people survived the disaster. One of the survivors, Ted Briggs, said in interviews after the sinking that Vice Admiral Lancelot Holland was last seen sitting in his chair, in utter dejection, making no attempt to escape from the sinking ship. 
In this account, his messenger took Lindemann's hand and the two walked to the forward flagmast. As the ship turned over, the two stood briefly to attention, then Lindemann and his messenger saluted. As the ship rolled to port, the messenger fell into the water. Lindemann continued his salute while clinging to the flagmast, going under with the ship.
 December 10, 1941: Admiral Sir Tom Phillips and Captain John Leach went down with the  after an attack by Japanese warplanes off the coast of Pahang, British Malaya.
 February 28, 1942: Rear Admiral Karel Doorman was killed in action when his flagship  was torpedoed in the Battle of the Java Sea. Part of the crew was rescued before the sinking, but the Dutch admiral chose to go down with the ship. Captain Lieutenant Eugène Lacomblé also died in the sinking.
 June 5, 1942: Rear Admiral Tamon Yamaguchi, on board the aircraft carrier , insisted on staying with the stricken ship during the Battle of Midway. The ship's commander, Captain Kaku, followed his example. Yamaguchi refused to allow his staff officers to stay with them. Yamaguchi and Kaku were last seen on the bridge of the stricken carrier waving to the crew who were abandoning ship. In addition, Captain Ryusaku Yanagimoto chose to remain with his ship  when it was scuttled after being destroyed in the same battle.
 February 7, 1943: Commander Howard W. Gilmore, captain of the American submarine , gave the order for crew to "clear the bridge" and leave the exposed deck of the submarine, as his crew was being attacked by a Japanese gunboat. Two men had been shot dead; Gilmore and two others were wounded. After all others had entered the sub and Gilmore found that time was critically short, he gave his last order: "Take her down." The executive officer, hearing his order, closed the hatch and submerged the crippled boat, saving the rest of the crew from the attack of the Japanese convoy escort. Commander Gilmore, who was never seen again, received the Medal of Honor posthumously for his "distinguished gallantry", making him the second submariner to receive this award.
 November 19, 1943: Captain John P. Cromwell went down on the sinking sub .
Over half of the ship's crew, 1,376 of 2,399, were rescued.
 October 25, 1944: Commander Ernest E. Evans, in the Battle off Samar, a part of the Battle of Leyte Gulf, captained Fletcher Class destroyer Johnston in a torpedo attack until it was sunk by a Japanese force that was vastly superior in number, firepower, and armor. Evans did not survive. Evans posthumously received the Medal of Honor. 
November 29, 1944: Captain Toshio Abe went down with the  after she was torpedoed by USS Archerfish.
December 24, 1944: Captain Charles Limbor went down with the Léopoldville after it was torpedoed and sank by U-486 5 miles from Cherbourg.
 April 7, 1945: Vice Admiral Seiichi Itō, the fleet admiral, and Captain Kosaku Aruga went down with the  during Operation Ten-Go.
 December 30, 1950: Luis González de Ubieta (born 1899), exiled Admiral of the Spanish Republican Navy, went down with his ship. He refused to be rescued when Chiriqui, a merchant vessel under his command, sank in the Caribbean Sea not far from Barranquilla.
January 10, 1952: After his ship was struck by a pair of rogue waves, Captain Kurt Carlsen of the  remained aboard his ship once her passengers and crew had been evacuated in order to oversee attempts to tow the crippled vessel into port. He was eventually joined by Ken Dancy, a member of the salvage tug's crew. When the time came to abandon ship, Carlsen said to Dancy that they would jump together; Dancy refused, saying he should go first so that Carlsen could be the last to leave the ship. The Flying Enterprise sank 48 minutes later.
July 26, 1956: Piero Calamai, the captain of the Italian liner Andrea Doria, after satisfying himself that all 1,660 passengers and crew had been safely evacuated following a collision with the  had determined to go down with the ship to atone for his errors leading to the disaster, which killed 46 people. During his supervision of the rescue operation, one of the largest in maritime history, Calamai turned to one of his officers and said softly, "If you are saved, maybe you can reach Genoa and see my family. ... Tell them I did everything I could." His officers finally convinced him to reluctantly board a lifeboat by refusing to leave him behind; nevertheless, Calamai made certain he was the last person off his doomed ship. Captain Calamai, who never commanded another vessel, reportedly asked repeatedly on his deathbed in 1972, "Are the passengers safe? Are the passengers off?".
 December 9, 1971: Captain Mahendra Nath Mulla, the captain of the Indian frigate , went down with the ship after it was attacked by a submarine in the Indo-Pakistani War of 1971. At least 194 members of the crew died in the sinking, which reportedly took two minutes.
Of the 989 people on board, 137 were rescued and 95 were later found dead in freezing waters or rafts.
Walbridge and one crew member died, while the fourteen crew members who made it to liferafts survived. Captain Walbridge was never found.
 October 2, 2015: Captain Michael Davidson, master of the cargo ship , was recorded on the voyage data recorder encouraging the ship's helmsman, not moving due to fear and exhaustion, to join him in abandoning the vessel, before the recording ended with both still on the bridge of the sinking ship.

Counter-examples

In some cases the captain may choose to scuttle the ship and escape danger rather than die as it sinks. This choice is usually available only if the damage does not immediately imperil a vast portion of the ship's company and occupants. If a distress call was successful and the crew and occupants, the ship's cargo, and other items of interest are rescued, then the vessel may not be worth anything as marine salvage and be allowed to sink. In other cases a military organization or navy might wish to destroy a ship to prevent it being taken as a prize or captured for espionage, such as occurred in the  incident. Commodities and war materiel carried as cargo might also need to be destroyed to prevent capture by the opposing side.

In other cases a captain may decide to save themselves to the detriment of their crew, the vessel, or its mission. A decision that shirks the responsibilities of the command of a vessel will usually bring upon the captain a legal, criminal, or social penalty, with military commanders often facing dishonor.

 July 17, 1880: The captain and crew of  abandoned the ship and their passengers in a storm expecting it would sink, but the ship was found with all passengers alive three days later. A key part of Joseph Conrad's 1899–1900 novel Lord Jim is based on this incident; Conrad had been a captain in the merchant marine before turning to writing.
 August 4, 1906: Captain Giuseppe Piccone abandoned  at the first opportunity. Between 150 and 400 people died when the ship sank.
 September 8, 1934; When a fire broke out on the SS Morro Castle, First Officer William Warms, in command after the death of Captain Robert Wilmott, led the crew in abandoning ship. 137 people died, mostly passengers.
 September 10, 1941: When the German submarine U-501 was forced to surface alongside a Canadian corvette, Korvettenkapitän Hugo Förster surrendered himself by jumping onto the Canadian ship. The First Watch Officer took over and had the U-boat scuttled just as the Canadians boarded. One Canadian and 11 Germans died.
With his submarine scuttled, he was one of three survivors to have made it off the bridge and up to the surface, before being captured by a Japanese destroyer crew later that morning. O'Kane was at first secretly held captive at the Ōfuna navy detention center, then later moved to the regular army Omori POW camp. Following his release, O'Kane was awarded the Medal of Honor for "conspicuous gallantry and intrepidity" during his submarine's final operations against Japanese shipping.
 November 12, 1965: When a fire broke out aboard , Captain Byron Voustinas was on the first lifeboat, which had only crew and no passengers aboard. 90 people died.
 April 7, 1990: Having been erroneously informed the ship was evacuated, Captain Hugo Larsen abandoned  after arson caused the ship to burn. 158 people died.
 August 3–4, 1991: Captain Yiannis Avranas of the cruise ship  abandoned ship without informing passengers that the ship was sinking. All 571 people on the ship survived. A Greek board of inquiry found Avranas and four officers negligent in their handling of the disaster.
 September 26, 2000: Captain Vassilis Giannakis and the crew abandoned the  after the ship hit the rocks off the Portes Inlets. 82 people died. The captain was sentenced to 16 years in prison while the first officer received a 19-year sentence.
 January 13, 2012: Captain Francesco Schettino abandoned his ship before hundreds of passengers had been evacuated during the Costa Concordia disaster. 32 people died in the accident. Schettino was sentenced to 16 years in prison for his role in the disaster. 
 April 16, 2014: Captain Lee Joon-seok abandoned the South Korean ferry MV Sewol. The captain and much of the crew were saved, while hundreds of students from Danwon High School embarked for their trip remained in their cabins, according to instructions provided by the crew. Many passengers apparently remained on the sinking vessel and died. Following this incident, the captain was arrested and put on trial beginning in early June 2014, when video footage filmed by some survivors and news broadcasters showed him being rescued by a coast guard vessel. Orders to abandon ship never came, and the vessel sank with all life rafts still in their stowage position. The captain was subsequently sentenced to 36 years in prison for his role in the deaths of the passengers, and was also given a life sentence, after being found guilty of murder of the 304 passengers that did not survive.
 June 1, 2015: The Chinese captain of the river cruise ship  left the ship before most passengers were rescued. In the end, 442 deaths were confirmed with 12 rescued among 454 on board.

Extended or metaphorical use
When used metaphorically, the "captain" may be simply the leader of a group of people, "the ship" may refer to some other place that is threatened by catastrophe, and "going down" with it may refer to a situation that implies a severe penalty or death. It is common for references to be made in the case of the military and when leadership during the situation is clear. So when a raging fire threatens to destroy a mine, the mine's supervisor, the "captain", may perish in the fire trying to rescue their workers trapped inside, and acquaintances might say that they went down with their ship or that they "died trying".

In aviation

The concept has been explicitly extended in law to the pilot in command of an aircraft, in the form of laws stating that they "[have] final authority and responsibility for the operation and safety of the flight". Jurisprudence has explicitly interpreted this by analogy with the captain of a sea vessel.

This is particularly relevant when an aircraft is forced to ditch in the ocean and becomes a floating vessel that will almost certainly sink. For example, following the crash of US Airways Flight 1549 into the Hudson River in 2009, pilot in command Chesley Sullenberger was the last person to exit the partially submerged aircraft, and performed a final check for any others on board before doing so. All 155 passengers and crew survived.

Similarly, on October 16, 1956, Pan Am Flight 6 was a Boeing 377 Stratocruiser (en route from Honolulu to San Francisco) that was forced to ditch in the Pacific Ocean due to multiple engine failures. The airliner broke apart when one of its wings collided with a wave swell. Airline Captain Richard N. Ogg was the last to exit the airplane during the successful mid-ocean ditching and rescue of all 31 on board by the US Coast Guard cutter . The airplane fuselage sank with no one on board a few minutes later.

Kohei Asoh, the captain of a Douglas DC-8 conducting Japan Air Lines Flight 2, gained notoriety for his honest assessment of his mistake (the "Asoh defense") in the 1988 book The Abilene Paradox. Asoh was the pilot in command during the 1968 accidental ditching in San Francisco Bay a few miles short of the runway. With the plane resting on the shallow bottom of the bay, he was the last one of the 107 occupants to exit the airplane; all survived with no injuries.

In academia
After a major sexual assault scandal at Baylor University, the university fired President Kenneth Starr and appointed him chancellor. A week later, Starr resigned as chancellor and "willingly accepted responsibility" for the actions at Baylor that "clearly fell short". He stated that his resignation for the scandal was "a matter of conscience", and said, "The captain goes down with the ship." He indicated that his resignation was necessary even though he "didn't know what was happening".

See also

Barratry (admiralty law)
Desertion
Don't Give Up the Ship (disambiguation)
Last words
Man overboard
Mutiny
Women and children first

References

Maritime culture
Etiquette
English phrases
Maritime disasters
English-language idioms
1900s neologisms
Quotations
RMS Titanic